The 2015–16 Navy Midshipmen men's basketball team represents the United States Naval Academy during the 2015–16 NCAA Division I men's basketball season. The Midshipmen, led by fifth year head coach Ed DeChellis, play their home games at Alumni Hall and were members of the Patriot League. They finished the season 19–14, 9–9 in Patriot League play to finish in a four way tie for fourth place. They defeated Lafayette in the first round of the Patriot League tournament to advance to the quarterfinals where they lost to Lehigh. Despite having 19 wins, they did not participate in a postseason tournament.

Previous season
The Midshipmen finished the season 13–19, 8–10 in Patriot League play to finish in a three way tie for sixth place. They advanced to the quarterfinals of the Patriot League tournament where they lost to Colgate.

Departures

Incoming recruits

2016 class recruits

Roster

Schedule

|-
!colspan=9 style="background:#00005D; color:white;"| Non-conference regular season

|-
!colspan=9 style="background:#00005D; color:white;"| Patriot League regular season

|-
!colspan=9 style="background:#00005D; color:white;"| Patriot League tournament

References

Navy Midshipmen men's basketball seasons
Navy
Navy
Navy